South Bridge Road is a major road in Singapore, running south of the Singapore River in Chinatown. It starts at Elgin Bridge and ends at the junction of Neil Road, Tanjong Pagar Road and Maxwell Road.

Landmarks
Buddha Tooth Relic Temple (佛牙寺)
Elgin Bridge
Eu Yan Sang
Fook Hai Building
Hong Lim Complex
Jamae Mosque
Maxwell Food Centre
Maxwell MRT station
One George Street (or ERGO insurance building; formerly Pidemco Centre)
Sri Mariamman Temple

References
.

External links

Uniquely Singapore website

 

Chinatown, Singapore
Outram, Singapore
Roads in Singapore
Singapore River